Harrods International Academy (HIA) is an international school in Phnom Penh, Cambodia.  Philippa Barson is the principal. Its current campus finished construction circa 2019. It serves until grade 12.

There are three campuses, all in Boeung Keng Kang  District (these areas were in Chamkar Mon District until 2019): the main campus and the early year campus, both in Boeung Keng Kang I, and the Olympic Campus 1 in Toul Svay Prey 1.

References

External links
 Harrods International Academy

International schools in Cambodia
Schools in Phnom Penh